Franck Pajonkowski (born 21 January 1964) is a French ice hockey player. He competed in the men's tournaments at the 1988 Winter Olympics and the 1994 Winter Olympics.

References

1964 births
Living people
Olympic ice hockey players of France
Ice hockey players at the 1988 Winter Olympics
Ice hockey players at the 1994 Winter Olympics
People from Douai
Sportspeople from Nord (French department)
Shawinigan Cataractes players
Chicoutimi Saguenéens (QMJHL) players
French expatriate sportspeople in Canada
French expatriate ice hockey people
Rouen HE 76 players